Saxon Shore was a military command of the Late Roman Empire, encompassing southern Britain and the coasts of northern France.

Saxon Shore may also refer to:

 Saxon Shore (band), an American post-rock band
 The Saxon Shore, a 1995 novel by Jack Whyte
 Saxon Shore Way, a modern walkway in Britain
 Saxon Shore, an electoral ward within the Borough of Ashford, Kent, UK

See also
Saxon Shore forts